This is a list of radio stations in Marlborough in New Zealand.

References

Marlborough
Marlborough Region